Quwê – also spelled Que, Kue, Qeve, Coa, Kuê and Keveh – was a Syro-Hittite Assyrian vassal state or province at various times from the 9th century BC to shortly after the death of Ashurbanipal around 627 BC in the lowlands of eastern Cilicia, and the name of its capital city, tentatively identified with Adana, in modern Turkey. The name Que reflects the Assyrian transmission of the indigenous name Hiyawa, the same state is known as Hume from Babylonian sources. The question whether the toponym Hiyawa is related to Ahhiyawa, the Hittite designation of Mycenaean Greeks, is at present hotly debated. The principal argument in favour of a Greek migration into Cilicia at the end of the Bronze Age is the mention of Muksa/Mopsos as the founder of the local dynasty in indigenous Luwian and Phoenician inscriptions. According to many translations of the Bible, Quwê was the place from which King Solomon obtained horses. (I Kings 10: 28, 29; II Chron. 1:16)

The species name of Cyclamen coum probably refers to Quwê.

See also

Ancient regions of Anatolia
Cinekoy inscription
Karatepe Bilingual

References

Sources
 Simo Parpola and Michael Porter, editors, The Helsinki Atlas of the Near East in the Neo-Assyrian Period,  (Helsinki, Finland, 2001), Gazetteer, p. 15.
Mirko Novák and Andreas Fuchs, Azatiwada, Awariku from the House of Mopsos, and Assyria. On the Dating of Karatepe in Cilicia, in: A. Payne, Š. Velharticka, J. Wintjes (ed.), Beyond all Boundaries. Anatolia in the 1st Millennium B.C. OBO 295 (Leuven, 2021), pp. 397-466.
 Mirko Novák, Kizzuwatna, Ḥiyawa, Quwe – Ein Abriss der Kulturgeschichte des Ebenen Kilikien, in J. Becker / R. Hempelmann / E. Rehm (ed.), Kulturlandschaft Syrien – Zentrum und Peripherie. Festschrift für Jan-Waalke Meyer, Alter Orient und Altes Testament 371, Ugarit-Verlag Münster 2010, pp. 397–425.
 Cilicia Chronology Group: A Comparative Stratigraphy of Cilicia. Results of the first three Cilician Chronology Workshops, in: Altorientalische Forschungen 44/2, 2017, pp. 150–186.

External links
 I Kings 10: 28, 29 in different translations of the Bible

 
Syro-Hittite states
Hebrew Bible places